Aoife Lynskey (born 1980) is a camogie player, winner of an All Ireland medal in 1996, and a player or panel member on Galway teams defeated in five subsequent All Ireland finals.

Other awards
National Camogie League 2002, 2005, All Ireland Intermediate, All Ireland Junior and Minor medals. Gael Linn Cup, two Ashbourne Cup with University of Limerick, |Féile with club.

References

External links
 Camogie.ie Official Camogie Association Website

1980 births
Living people
Galway camogie players
UL GAA camogie players